Paul Morgan is a Melbourne–based architect whose work is prominent throughout Australia. His career thus far has included being an editor, lecturer, critic, and writer.

Background and career
Paul Morgan was born in Melbourne and later attended the RMIT University (Royal Melbourne Institute of Technology) to study architecture, where he completed a Master of Design in Urban Design.  

Morgan taught architectural design at RMIT from 1989–2016, where he coordinated the University’s Master of Architecture course during the early 1990s. During this time he also served as Editor of Melbourne–based architecture publication Transition Magazine. In 1997, while still teaching, he set up PMA - his private architectural practice. 

In 2007, Morgan's architectural practice was awarded the Robin Boyd Award for Residential Buildings by the Australian Institute of Architects (AIA) for the Cape Schanck House. His practice has won awards from the European Centre for Architecture, Art and Urban Design and was also nominated for the Zumtobel Award honoring outstanding sustainable contributions to architecture and humanity. PMA has exhibited at the Venice, Istanbul and Beijing Biennials as well as at the World Architecture Festival.

He later taught at Monash University from 2016-2017 where he became a regular lecturer.

GippsTAFE Learning Centre, Leongatha

Designed in Leongatha, this is the first TAFE building in Australia to be awarded a 5 Star Green Star rating by the Green Building Council of Australia.

The building responds to the kinetics of the environment with a design similar to an envelope to enhance natural ventilation throughout the building. Wind scoops surrounding the south elevation windows direct airflow into teaching areas, reducing the need for air-conditioners. The aerodynamic form enables air to pass freely through the structure while fairings on the north elevation deflect hot northerly winds and capture the cooling easterly breeze. The result is a building that incorporates the building’s conceptual and sustainable design aspects without having to compromise one for the other.

The steel cladding communicates the concept of the typical industrial sheds surrounding the town. The local design elements also translate to the building grounds with the exploration of the Australian veranda through a contemporary design. The materials used have a degree of sustainability while the innovative envelope encloses an energetic and varied series of interior spaces.

Cape Schanck House

The Cape Schanck House (Australia 2006) is positioned in close proximity to a jagged shoreline vulnerable to the natural elements. The precarious location of the house and the integration of such natural elements have been crucial design elements resulting from an innovative and sensitive approach to residential architecture. Paul Morgan describes the Cape Schanck House as a ‘breakthrough’ project for the Paul Morgan Architects practice. Morgan discusses this house as ‘pure architecture’, a project whose architectural intent was not mediated by constraints.

Morgan describes the architectural approach to the Cape Schanck House and the focus on sustainability as expressive. The direct integration of the house with the coastal vegetation operates as a design method to direct the form of the house. The Cape Schanck House illustrates a consistent design approach that Morgan defines as ‘kinetics of the environment’. Expressionism found in nature is utilised as a tool to inform the design process. Aspects of nature are used as inspiration and mimicked in various details throughout the design. This technique is part of a holistic process which Morgan and PMA adopt in order to offer innovative solutions to architecture by which design in continually being re-questioned rather than reproduced as a highly technical solution.

The Cape Schanck House is considered the exemplary project designed by PMA and this is reinforced by the recognition of the 2007 National RAIA Robin Boyd Award for Residential Architecture and Houses Award in the 2007 RAIA Awards Victorian Chapter.

Awards
       2014 – Commendation Award, Architecture Media Award, Australian Institute of Architects Awards, Victorian Chapter: Minimono 01 Paul Morgan Architects
	Shortlisted, Heritage Category, Australian Institute of Architects Awards, Victorian Chapter: Emerald Hill Library
       2013 – Commendation Award, Commercial Architecture, Australian Institute of Architects Awards, Victorian Chapter
       2012 – Winner, 2012, The Chicago Athenaeum & European Centre for Architecture Art Design and Urban Studies International Architecture Awards; Shortlisted, Residential Architecture Award, Australian Institute of Architects Awards, Victorian Chapter: Trunk House; Shortlisted, Public Architecture Award, Australian Institute of Architects Awards, Victorian Chapter; NMIT Student Centre Epping; Finalist, Houses Magazine Awards, Trunk House 
       2011 – GippsTAFE Learning Centre, Leongatha: Shortlisted, Public Architecture, Australian Institute of Architects Awards, Victorian Chapter; Shortlisted, Sustainable Architecture, Australian Institute of Architects Awards, Victorian Chapter; Shortlisted, Regional Architecture, Australian Institute of Architects Awards, Victorian Chapter; Winner, Master Builders Association, Excellence in Commercial Buildings South East region over $6 million
       2009 – Honorable Mention, 2009 Architecture Australia Prize for Unbuilt Work, Blowhouse: life support unit
	2009 – Winner, Green Good Design Award, 2009, The Chicago Athenaeum: Museum of Architecture and Desigand the European Centre, Greece
	2008 – Cape Schanck House Winner, Built Form and Design category, Victorian Coastal Awards for Excellence – Building and Design category
	2007 – Cape Schanck House Robin Boyd Award, Royal Australian Institute of Architects Awards, Residential category 1st Commendation, Best Residential Building, Cape Schanck House, Architectural Excellence in the South East Awards Houses Award, Royal Australian Institute of Architects Awards, Victorian Chapter, Residential category Nominated, Zumtobel Group Award. The Cape Schanck house was one of only 20 projects nominated internationally for the biennial award which honours outstanding sustainable solutions in architecture and humanity Invited Entry, (Inside): Australian Design Review IDEA Awards, Residential Interior Category
	2006 – Newman College, Melbourne University, refurbishment Shortlisted, Royal Australian Institute of Architects Awards, Victorian Chapter, Heritage category
	2005  – RMIT University SIAL Sound Studios Shortlisted, Royal Australian Institute of Architects Awards, Victorian Chapter, Institutional (Alterations and Extensions) category
	2003 – RMIT University School of Computer Science & I.T. Shortlisted, Royal Australian Institute of Architects Awards, Victorian Chapter, Institutional (Alterations and Extensions) category
	2001 – Lecture Theatre, VUT Werribee Commendation, Royal Australian Institute of Architects Awards, Victorian Chapter, Institutional category
	2000 – Monash Faculty of Information Technology Interior Shortlisted, Royal Australian Institute of Architects Awards, Victorian Chapter, Interior Architecture category
	1991 – Second Prize, Companion City Second Transition Architectural Design Competition
	1987 – Commendation (Transition magazine) Journalism Category, RAIA Awards

References

External links 
 
 

Living people
Architects from Melbourne
Year of birth missing (living people)